Macrosoma subornata is a moth-like butterfly in the family Hedylidae. It was described by William Warren in 1904.

References

Hedylidae
Butterflies described in 1904